Senlis Cathedral is a Roman Catholic church and former cathedral in Senlis, Oise, France.

It was formerly the seat of the Bishopric of Senlis, abolished under the Concordat of 1801, when its territory was passed to the Diocese of Beauvais.

Notre-Dame Cathedral was built, for the most part, during the third quarter of the 12th century, when the royal city of Senlis was experiencing a true "golden age". It was profoundly renovated in the 13th and 16th centuries.

With its portal of the crowning of the Virgin (12th century), its monumental 78 meter south tower (13th century) and transept facades all masterpieces of the high and late Gothic, Notre Dame de Senlis takes its place among the most noticeable cathedrals in France. This is better demonstrated as the cathedral of Senlis was included in the first list of historical monuments in 1840.

History 
The construction of the first cathedral is located at the end of the 4th or the beginning of the 5th century within the perimeter of the enclosure. The cathedral being the seat of a bishop's authority, the presence of a first bishop led to its construction. The word "cathedral" comes from the Latin cathedra and the Greek kathedra, derived from hedra which means "chair". The ensemble formed the episcopal group: buildings (the cloister, the baptistry, the episcopal palace) grouped around the cathedral. The common buildings of the canons must have been located to the north of the present site of the cathedral, as archaeological excavations have revealed the presence of kitchens before the 12th and 13th centuries.

The construction of Notre-Dame de Senlis was started around 1153 on the site of older sanctuaries, under the impulse of Bishop Pierre (1134-1151). The main drivers of this construction were the frequent presence of the kings of France, and the very strong personality of the bishop. The financing of the construction was essentially from the work of the bishops who were financially less well off than the other bishops of the region, their sees were small in size and thus had quite the modest income of the diocese. This explains the small size of the sanctuary. The participation of the king and the canons were almost non-existent.

Construction began simultaneously at both the east and west ends of the building. In 1160, the central portal of the western façade was already done. In 1167, the cathedral already had its choir and its western façade. In 1175 the nave was connected to the choir. Around 1180, the vaulted cathedral was almost completed except for the transepts. However, it was consecrated on 16 June 1191 by the Archbishop of Reims Guillaume of the White Hands. Its construction lasted about 40 years; but it was still lacking its transepts.

The cathedral was greatly altered in the 13th century. Around 1240, the southern tower was extended by a remarkable two-storey spire, a magnificent jewel of the cathedral, and the interior perspective was interrupted by a piercing transept which left the nave shorter than the choir.

At the end of the 14th century, the chapter house was built, and around 1465 there was added the Bailli chapel, founded by Gilles de Rouvroy, known as Saint-Simon, bailiff of Senlis and ancestor of the Duke of Saint-Simon. He was buried there in 1477, as well as some of his descendants.

In 1504, a fire, caused by lightning, destroyed the framework and caused the vaults to collapse, with the exception of that of the first bay. Thanks to the donations of the kings Louis XII and Francis I, the upper parts of the cathedral were reconstructed by raising them by 6 metres, the aisles were doubled and the side facades had a very rich flamboyant decoration. The restoration began in 1506 and lasted until 1515.

In 1520, the façade of the southern transept was added. Its magnificent portal was built by Martin Chambiges and continued by his son Pierre; it dates from 1538 and the north portal is from 1560. The eastern chapels date from the same time.

In 1671 the chapel of the Sacred Heart was constructed on the ancient Gallo-Roman wall.

In 1777 the choir received a neo-classical decoration which can still be seen today.

The French Revolution destroyed the furniture and destroyed the heads of statues and columns of the western portal, which were replaced in the middle of the 19th century.

The cathedral is classified as an historic monument on the first list of 1840; the old library was classified in 1929.

In 1986, the restoration of the interior was completed, and in 1993 the restoration of the spire was completed.

The interior

References

Sources
 Catholic Hierarchy: Diocese of Senlis
 Hiérarchie catholique : Diocèse de Senlis
 Senlis Cathedral at The Planet's Cathedrals

Former cathedrals in France
Churches in Oise
Monuments historiques of Hauts-de-France